Donald T. Franke (August 16, 1921 – September 25, 2013) was an American politician, lawyer, and jurist.

Born in Eyota, Minnesota, Franke served in the United States Army Air Forces as a pilot during World War II. He received his associate degree from Rochester Community College, his bachelor's degree in journalism, and his law degree from University of Minnesota. Franke taught journal at Central Washington University. He then practiced law in Rochester, Minnesota. From 1957 to 1963, Franke served in the Minnesota House of Representatives. From 1964 until 1975, Franke served as a Minnesota District Court judge. In 1975, Franke and his wife moved to Naples, Florida where he practiced law. Franke died in Naples, Florida.

Notes

1921 births
2013 deaths
People from Naples, Florida
People from Eyota, Minnesota
United States Army Air Forces pilots
University of Minnesota School of Journalism and Mass Communication alumni
University of Minnesota Law School alumni
Florida lawyers
Minnesota state court judges
Central Washington University faculty
Members of the Minnesota House of Representatives
20th-century American judges
20th-century American lawyers
United States Army Air Forces personnel of World War II
Military personnel from Minnesota